Sadkowice  is a village in the administrative district of Gmina Solec nad Wisłą, within Lipsko County, Masovian Voivodeship, in east-central Poland.

The village has an approximate population of 300.

References

Sadkowice